The 1958 Alabama gubernatorial election was held on November 4, 1958. Incumbent Democrat Jim Folsom was term limited and could not seek a second consecutive term.

Democratic Party nomination

At this time Alabama was a de facto one-party state. Because of this, every Democratic Party nominee was considered safe for election. The real contest for governor took place during the primary.

Popular incumbent Governor Jim Folsom, a racial moderate, was barred from running for reelection, as Governors could not succeed themselves at the time. Therefore, the Democratic primary was an open contest.

Candidates
 Laurie C. Battle, U.S. Representative 
 John G. Crommelin, retired Rear Admiral
 W. E. Dodd
 Shearen Elebash
 Jimmy Faulkner, former State Senator and former Mayor of Bay Minette 
 James Gulatte
 Karl Harrison
 George C. Hawkins, State Representative
 C. C. Owen
 John Malcolm Patterson, Attorney General
 Shorty Price
 A. W. Todd, Commissioner of Agriculture and Industries
 Billy Walker
 George Wallace, Third Judicial Circuit Judge and former State Representative

The two front-runners, Patterson and Wallace, held deeply different positions on racial segregation issues. While Patterson, known primarily as crime-fighting attorney general, ran on a very segregationist platform and accepted an official endorsement from Ku Klux Klan, Wallace, a close ally of Folsom, refused to cooperate with the KKK and was endorsed by the NAACP.

Primary results 

Primaries were held on June 3, 1958.

Runoff
Because none of candidates won a majority, a runoff was held on June 24, 1958, in order to determine which candidate received the nomination.

Republican Party nomination

William Longshore, a former Republican Party nominee for the U.S. House of Representatives from the 9th district (lost, winning 34.12% votes) won the gubernatorial nomination unopposed.

General election

After his defeat, George Wallace, who was a racial moderate, modified his public position in order to gain the white support necessary to win the next election.

References

http://www.ourcampaigns.com/RaceDetail.html?RaceID=80047

1958
Alabama
Gubernatorial
Alabama gubernatorial election